Invertis University is a NAAC Accredited private university located in Bareilly, Uttar Pradesh, India. It is situated on Bareilly-Lucknow NH-24, 290 km from the national capital Delhi and 240 km from the state capital Lucknow. The Chancellor of the university is Umesh Gautam (Mayor Bareilly & BJP politician) and the Vice-Chancellor is Y. D. S. Arya.

Campus
The campus of Invertis University is lush green and environment friendly. The university have wide spread well maintained massive area. The campus provides other facilities like Wifi, Gym, PCO, ATM, Transport. Vicinity to Bareilly-Lucknow NH-24, makes campus very approachable.

History
Invertis University has its roots with the Invertis Institute of Management Studies, established 1998 with 88 students. Invertis University Bareilly (Uttar Pradesh) has been Established by an Act (No. 22 of 2010) of State Legislature of Uttar Pradesh as a State Private University and is empowered to award degrees as specified by UGC under section  22 of the UGC Act 1956.

Constituent colleges
The university includes the following colleges

 Invertis college of Education.
 Invertis college of Engineering & Technology.
 Invertis college of Bio-Science & Bio-Technology.
 Invertis college of Management.
 Invertis college of Computer Applications.
 Invertis college of Pharmaceutical Sciences.
 Invertis college of Legal Studies.
 Invertis college of Architecture.
 Invertis college of Journalism & Mass Communication.
 Invertis college of Applied Sciences and Humanities 
 Invertis college of Agriculture.

References

External links

Private universities in Uttar Pradesh
Educational institutions established in 2010
2010 establishments in Uttar Pradesh
Education in Bareilly
Private engineering colleges in Uttar Pradesh